"The Only Way Is Up" is a song written by George Jackson and Johnny Henderson and originally released in 1980 as a single by soul singer Otis Clay. In 1988, it became a chart-topping single in the United Kingdom for Yazz and the Plastic Population. The song is used as the theme tune to the popular ITV2/ITVBe reality television series The Only Way Is Essex.

Otis Clay version
The song was written by George Jackson and Johnny Henderson. It was first recorded by Otis Clay and released as a single by Echo Records in 1980. Though not a hit, the song became the title track of Clay's album The Only Way Is Up, released in Japan in 1982 and then North America in 1985. It is also included on his 2012 album Truth Is.

Yazz version

The Yazz version was produced by Jonathan More and Matt Black (better known as dance duo Coldcut, who had worked with British singer Yazz on their hit single "Doctorin' the House"). "The Only Way Is Up" was Yazz's first solo single, credited to her under the name Yazz and the Plastic Population. Released as the first single from her debut album, Wanted (1988), the song became an instant smash hit, spending five weeks at number one in the United Kingdom, and ultimately becoming the second biggest selling single of the year. Also on the Eurochart Hot 100, it soared to the number one position. In the United States it reached number two on the Billboard dance chart, although only making number 96 on the Billboard Hot 100.

A 2009 remix was released in the United Kingdom on 7 September 2009.

Background and release
After leaving school, Yazz got a job in a nightclub in Soho and got into her first band called The Biz. She also worked as a model and then met the managers of English musical duo Wham! who would be her managers. She took singing lessons and made demo songs that was introduced to electronic music duo Coldcut. Together, they wrote "Doctorin' the House" which incorporates samples from various sources, mainly TV and film dialogue. It reached number six on the UK Singles Chart in March 1988 and was a club staple. The next song they would release was "The Only Way Is Up". 

Yazz told in an 1988 interview, "It was first suggested that Coldcut do a remake of the track. But they weren't keen because they felt they might spoil the original, but I felt it would be perfect for me." Coldcut decided, however, to take on the production role. Yazz expanded, "It was a real challene for them to work with a live vocalist, as well as for me for my first single. With "Doctorin' the House" they had laid down the groove and then said 'OK, now sing over it.' This time the song was arranged and structured before we even started recording." Their house version of "The Only Way Is Up" was released in July 1988, and become a huge hit in the clubs and on the charts.

Chart performance
Yazz' cover of "The Only Way Is Up" was very successful globally. In Europe, it peaked at number-one in Belgium, Denmark, Ireland, the Netherlands, Sweden
and the United Kingdom. In the last of these, it hit the top spot in its third week at the UK Singles Chart, on 31 July 1988. The single spent a total of five weeks on the top of the chart, becoming the second biggest selling single of the year. It entered the top 10 also in Austria (5), Finland (3), France (4), West Germany (3), Iceland (9), Norway (5), and Switzerland (2). In the latter, it was held off reaching number-one by Koreana's "Hand In Hand". On the Eurochart Hot 100, the song hit number one in September 1988. Outside Europe, "The Only Way Is Up" hit number-one in New Zealand, while reaching number two in Australia. On the Billboard Hot Dance Club Play chart in the United States, it peaked at number two. 

"The Only Way Is Up" earned a gold record in Australia and the UK, with a sale of 50,000 and 400,000 singles. And in France, it earned a silver record, after 200,000 units were sold there.

Critical reception
Pan-European magazine Music & Media wrote, "Produced by Coldcut, this is an electro-soul number with more than a touch of house influences. A good, radio-friendly, dance song." Matthew Collin from Record Mirror declared it as "a tale of love under stress, dedication and survival, all set to an infectious house beat." He added, "'The Only Way Is Up' is where bad house music crashes into gay Seventies disco and ends up in the top 10."

Music video
A music video was produced to promote the single. It was later published on YouTube in 2018, and by March 2023, the video had generated more than 6.8 million views.

Formats and track listings

 7" single / CD single / cassette
 "The Only Way Is Up" — 4:02
 "Bad House Music" — 4:28

 12" maxi
 "The Only Way Is Up" — 6:44
 "Bad House Music" — 7:07

 12" maxi
 "The Only Way Is Up" (UK extended club mix) — 6:45
 "The Only Way Is Up" (the up up up mix) — 7:01
 "The Only Way Is Up" (acid dub) — 5:50

 12" US Promo vinyl
 "The Only Way Is Up" (UK extended club mix) — 6:43
 "The Only Way Is Up" (Lp version) — 4:01
 "The Only Way Is Up" (the popstand remix) — 6:57
 "The Only Way Is Up" (acid dub) — 5:50
 "The Only Way Is Up" (the up up up mix) — 7:01

 CD maxi
 "The Only Way Is Up" (7" edit) — 4:02
 "The Only Way Is Up" (12" version) — 6:48
 "The Only Way Is Up" (speng) — 6:01
 "Bad House Music" — 3:00

 12" maxi – Remixes
 "The Only Way Is Up" (the Bam Bam remix) — 7:24
 "The Only Way Is Up" (the up up up mix) — 7:24
 "Bad House Music" — 4:28

Charts and sales

Weekly charts

Year-end charts

Certifications

See also
Acid house
House music
Second Summer of Love

References

External links
 Lyrics of this song
 

1980 singles
Otis Clay songs
1988 debut singles
Yazz songs
European Hot 100 Singles number-one singles
Irish Singles Chart number-one singles
Dutch Top 40 number-one singles
Number-one singles in Belgium
Number-one singles in Denmark
Number-one singles in New Zealand
Number-one singles in Sweden
UK Singles Chart number-one singles
UK Independent Singles Chart number-one singles
Songs about poverty
Songs written by George Jackson (songwriter)
Big Life Records singles
The Only Way Is Essex
1980 songs
Acid house songs
English house music songs